Adolfo Díaz-Ambrona Moreno (26 July 1908 – 17 December 1971) was a Spanish politician who served as Minister of Agriculture of Spain between 1965 and 1969, during the Francoist dictatorship.

His father-in-law was Luis Bardají, briefly Minister of Education in 1935 during the Second Spanish Republic. His son Adolfo Díaz-Ambrona Bardají founded the People's Alliance in Extremadura, and another son Juan was president of the Provincial Deputation of Badajoz.

References

1908 births
1971 deaths
Agriculture ministers of Spain
Government ministers during the Francoist dictatorship